Southside High School (aka Southside) is located at 5700 NC HWY 33 E, in Chocowinity, a small town in Beaufort County, North Carolina, with a ZIP code of 27817. It is in Beaufort County Schools.

Southside is a 1A school. 

The attendance zone includes Chocowinity, Aurora, Blounts Creek, and Edward.

It was founded in 2000, when Chocowinity High School and Aurora High School were consolidated into one school. Chocowinity Middle School and Aurora Middle school serve as feeder schools to Southside.

There are approximately 500 students attending Southside, which houses grades 9–12 on a 4 block schedule.

The school's floorplan consists of 4 main halls, 2 of which pertain to certain areas of study. There is a Math/Science/History hall, an English/Technology hall, and a small area dedicated to Performing Arts (Band), one art class, and a Health classroom.

Southside also has a multi-purpose gym, which houses the basketball and volleyball programs; a stadium, which houses its football, soccer, and track and field programs; and separate baseball and softball fields. A double tennis court is also located on campus, though there is no official tennis program.

The school mascot is the Seahawk. The school's primary spirit color is teal, along with secondary colors including navy blue, gold and white.

Athletics
Cheerleading
Girls' Basketball
Golf
JV Baseball
JV Basketball
JV Football
Soccer
Softball
Track
Varsity Baseball
Varsity Basketball
Varsity Football
Volleyball

References

Public high schools in North Carolina
Educational institutions established in 2000
Schools in Beaufort County, North Carolina
2000 establishments in North Carolina